Cyanoboletus sinopulverulentus is a species of bolete fungus in the family Boletaceae. Described as new to science in 2013, it is found in Shaanxi Province, central China. It is a member of the Cyanoboletus pulverulentus species complex. It was originally named as a species of Boletus in 2013 before being transferred to Cyanoboletus in 2014.

See also
 List of Boletus species

References

External links

Boletaceae
Fungi described in 2013
Fungi of Asia